Turn, Turn, Turn may refer to:

 "Turn! Turn! Turn!", a 1959 song by Pete Seeger that later became a hit for The Byrds
 Turn! Turn! Turn! (album), an album by The Byrds
 "Turn, Turn, Turn" (CSI), an episode of the TV series CSI: Crime Scene Investigation
 "Turn! Turn! Turn!" (True Blood), a 2012 episode of the TV series True Blood
 "Turn, Turn, Turn", an episode of the TV series 7th Heaven
 Turn, Turn, Turn (Agents of S.H.I.E.L.D.), a 2014 episode of the American TV series Agents of S.H.I.E.L.D.

See also
 Turn (disambiguation)